Lawrence Charles May (born 26 December 1958) is an English former professional footballer who played as a central defender, making over 350 career appearances.

Career
Born in Sutton Coldfield, May played for Warren, Leicester City, New England Tea Men, Barnsley, Sheffield Wednesday and Brighton & Hove Albion.

May was signed by Leicester City after playing youth football in Birmingham, and made his first-team debut at the age of 17. He suffered an injury and was sent to American team New England Tea Men for experience, but suffered a further injury whilst there. He turned professional the year before Gary Lineker, with Lineker being tasked with cleaning May's playing boots. May scored the only goal of the game as Leicester beat Leyton Orient to win the Second Division championship. He moved to Barnsley in August 1983 after losing his place in the first-team following a suspension. The transfer was for Barnsley's then-record fee of £150,000.

References

1958 births
Living people
English footballers
English expatriate footballers
Leicester City F.C. players
New England Tea Men players
Barnsley F.C. players
Sheffield Wednesday F.C. players
Brighton & Hove Albion F.C. players
English Football League players
North American Soccer League (1968–1984) players
Expatriate soccer players in the United States
Association football defenders
English expatriate sportspeople in the United States
Sportspeople from Sutton Coldfield